Bayono (Enamesi, Swesu) is a Papuan language spoken in the highlands of Papua Province, Indonesia. All that is known of Bayono is a few hundred words recorded in first-contact situations recorded in Wilbrink (2004) and Hischier (2006).

A Bayono word list from Jacky Menanti is published in Wilbrink (2004).

Kovojab may be closely related.

References

Bayono–Awbono languages